The Final of the 2009 Super 14 season, a provincial rugby union competition in the Southern Hemisphere, took place on 30 May 2009 at Loftus Versfeld Stadium in Pretoria, South Africa. The Bulls won the match 61 points to 17 over the visiting Chiefs side, who are based in Hamilton, New Zealand. This large win by the Bulls, is highest winning score, and highest winning margin ever in the Super 14 competition.

Road to the Final

Match

First half
The Chiefs scored first but could not contain the bulls rampant attack ending the first half at 34-7

Second half
Again the Chiefs scored first through Mils Muliania, but the Bulls ran away with it with two tries to Bryan Habana 61-17

Match details

References

Final
2009
2009 in South African rugby union
2009 in New Zealand rugby union
Chiefs (rugby union) matches
Bulls (rugby union) matches